Fapaha-Massafoavogo is a village in northern Ivory Coast. It is in the sub-prefecture of Korhogo, Korhogo Department, Poro Region, Savanes District.

Until 2012, Fapaha-Massafoavogo was in the commune of Fapaha-M'Binguébougou. In March 2012, Fapaha-M'Binguébougou became one of 1126 communes nationwide that were abolished. M'Binguébougou is the name of a village nearby to Fapaha-Massafoavogo.

Notes

Populated places in Savanes District
Populated places in Poro Region